Waffle the Wonder Dog is a British live action children's television series produced by Darrall Macqueen for CBeebies. It is aimed at four to seven year olds. The programme was first broadcast in February 2018 and it has since run to four seasons.

Synopsis
Waffle is a talking dog (a red miniature poodle), who is adopted by the Brooklyn-Bell blended family after they find him in their house. Waffle always causes trouble, especially with cat-loving neighbour Mrs Hobbs.

Cast

Episode listing

Season 1
The fifteen episodes of Season 1 were first broadcast on CBeebies from 26 February to 16 March 2018.

Season 2
The fifteen episodes of Season 2 were first broadcast on CBeebies from 2 July to 20 July 2018.

Season 3
The sixteen episodes of Season 3 were first broadcast on CBeebies, starting with a Christmas special on 20 December 2018, followed by the rest of the series from 1 April to 19 April 2019.

Season 4
The fourteen episodes of Season  4 were first broadcast on CBeebies from 30 March to 5 April 2020.

Awards
In 2018, Waffle the Wonder Dog was a nominee in the Children's Pre-School Live Action category at the Children's BAFTA awards. Also in 2018, it was a finalist in the Up to 6 Fiction category at the Prix Jeunesse International Festival. In 2019 the programme was a nominee in the Best Pre-School Programme category at the Broadcast Awards.

References

2010s British children's television series
2010s preschool education television series
British preschool education television series
British television shows featuring puppetry
English-language television shows
BBC children's television shows
CBeebies
Television shows about dogs